138th Street may refer to:

New York City Subway stations in the Bronx:
 Third Avenue – 138th Street (IRT Pelham Line); serving the  trains
 138th Street – Grand Concourse (IRT Jerome Avenue Line); serving the  trains
 138th Street (IRT Third Avenue Line), demolished

138th Street station (New York Central Railroad)

Other uses:
 The sixth song in The Walkmen's Bows + Arrows album